Alexandre François Malbranche (6 April 1818, Bernay, Eure – 16 May 1888, Rouen) was a French pharmacist, botanist and mycologist. He is known for his botanical and mycological studies associated with Normandy,

He received his education in Rouen, where he subsequently spent his career as a pharmacist. He served as president of the Société des amis des sciences de Rouen, and for several years was a member of the Société botanique de France (1879–1888).

He was the author of treatises on lichens, fungi, teratology in plants, Darwinism and on the botanical genus Rubus. As a taxonomist, he co-circumscribed a number of Rubus species. The mycological genus Malbranchea was named in his honor by Pier Andrea Saccardo (1882).

Selected works 
 Catalogue des plantes cellulaires et vasculaires de la Seine-inférieure, 1864 – Catalog of cellular and vascular plants of Seine-Inférieure.
 Catalogue descriptif des lichens de la Normandie : classés d'après la méthode du Dr. Nylander, 1870 – Descriptive catalog on lichens of Normandy.
 Le transformisme, ses origines, ses principes, ses impossibilités, 1874 – Transformism, origins, principles, impossibilities.
 Essai sur les Rubus normands, 1875 – Essay on Rubus found in Normandy.
 Contributions à l'étude monographique du genre Graphis, 1884 – Contributions to the study of the lichen genus Graphis.

References 

1818 births
1888 deaths
People from Bernay, Eure
French pharmacists
19th-century French botanists
French lichenologists
French mycologists